Thizz Iz Allndadoe is a solo album released by rapper, Keak da Sneak. It was his first for Thizz Entertainment, one of the largest Hyphy labels in California.

Track listings
"Who Started Hyphy"- 4:03 (Featuring Mac Dre, PSD)  
"Stunna Shadez On"- 3:22  
"Again"- 2:47  
"Allndadoe"- 3:47  
"Bout It, Bout It"- 2:54  
"The Originals"- 3:58  
"4 Freaks"- 4:29 (Featuring Mistah F.A.B., Turf Talk) 
"Doin' It Well"- 3:58  
"My Life"- 1:45  
"What, What"- 3:25 (Featuring Messy Marv) 
"Messenger"- 4:19  
"F tha Dogg"- 1:50  
"Undaworld Ties"- 3:59 (Featuring Rydah J. Klyde)

2006 albums
Keak da Sneak albums
Thizz Entertainment albums